Gwen is a Michelin Guide-starred restaurant in Los Angeles, California.

See also
 List of Michelin starred restaurants in Los Angeles and Southern California

References

External links
 

Michelin Guide starred restaurants in California
Restaurants in Los Angeles